The 2018 Chinese Figure Skating Championships was held on December 23 and 24, 2017 in Changchun. Medals were awarded in the disciplines of men's singles, ladies' singles, pair skating, and ice dance.

Results

Men

Ladies

Pairs

Ice dance

References

Citations 

Chinese Figure Skating Championships
2017 in figure skating
Chinese Figure Skating Championships, 2018
Sport in Changchun